Krásný Les may refer to:

Krásný Les (Karlovy Vary District) in Karlovy Vary District, Czech Republic
Krásný Les (Liberec District) in Liberec District, Czech Republic